The Canisius Golden Griffins football program were the intercollegiate American football team for Canisius College located in Buffalo, New York. The team competed in the NCAA Division I-AA and were members of the Metro Atlantic Athletic Conference. The school's first football team was fielded in 1918. Canisius participated in football from 1918 to 1949, and again from 1975 to 2002, compiling an all-time record of 241–251–26. At the conclusion of the 2002 season, the Canisius football program was discontinued, along with seven other school athletic programs, as part of an effort to overhaul and streamline the school's athletic department.

Notable former players
Notable alumni include:
Tommy Colella: Defensive back, Detroit Lions 1942–43, Cleveland Rams 1944–45, Cleveland Browns 1946–48, Buffalo Bills 1949
Ed Doyle: Offensive lineman, Buffalo Bisons 1927
Dick Poillon: Halfback, Washington Redskins 1942, 1946–49
Richard Nurse: Wide receiver Hamilton Tiger-Cats 1990-95

Year-by-year results

Championships

Conference championships 

Conference affiliations:
1918–25, Independent
1926–49, Western New York Little Three Conference
1950–66, No team
1967–72, Independent
1973–92, Division III Independent
1993–2002, Metro Atlantic Athletic Conference

Bowl game appearances

References

 
American football teams established in 1918
American football teams disestablished in 2002
1918 establishments in New York (state)
2002 establishments in New York (state)